The Permanent Presidential Music Commission (PPMC) of Kenya was a government Commission 

The Commission was established in 1988 to promote the development and practice of music and dance; the development of the Kenyan music industry and to preserve Kenyan musical arts and expression.

In 2008, the Ministry of State for Public Service transformed the Commission into the Department of Music under the Ministry of State for National Heritage and Culture

References

Politics of Kenya
Government agencies of Kenya
2012 in Kenya
Law of Kenya
Kenya articles by importance